Frederick W. Beinecke (1887–1971) was an American philanthropist who was the founder of Yale University's Beinecke Rare Book & Manuscript Library.

He was the son of one of the main financier and one of three co-founders, with Harry S. Black and hotelier Fred Sterry, of the Plaza Hotel. He lived in Cranford, New Jersey with his wife Carrie Regina Sperry Beinecke (daughter of William Miller Sperry) from the mid-1910s to the mid-1920s. He was the father of William Sperry Beinecke and grandfather of Frances Beinecke.

References

External links 
Beinecke Family Papers. Beinecke Rare Book and Manuscript Library, Yale University.

1887 births
1971 deaths
People from Cranford, New Jersey
20th-century American philanthropists